Belfast Bay may refer to: 

Mercers Creek Bay, Antigua, formerly Belfast Bay
Belfast Bay (Maine), Belfast, Maine